The Mahidi (Mati Hidup dengan Indonesia, meaning Live and Die with Indonesia) was a militia in East Timor loyal to Indonesia. Its origin is traced back to groups who lost lands and power for fighting the Portuguese and those who collaborated with the Japanese during World War II. The militia was founded in December 1998 and its operations were centered around the Cassa area in the southern Ainaro district. The location is strategic since it is at the crossroads between Manufahi, Ainaro, and Cova Lima districts.  Mahidi participated in the 1999 East Timorese crisis, and the group was one of the most violent of the armed forces during the crisis. They were linked to the Suai Church massacre which led to around 200 deaths as well as other mass killings.

They were led by the de Carvalho brothers whom human rights supporters accuse of many crimes. After the East Timorese crisis, members of the militia lived in camps in West Timor and had sought assistance from the Indonesian government, citing a perceived unreciprocated patriotic service to Indonesia. In October 2001, several members had already went back to East Timor including 378 refugees led by Nemecio Lopes de Carvalho, the deputy commander of Mahidi.

References

Further reading 

 

Military of East Timor
Nationalist organizations
1998 establishments in Asia